WHMV-LP (97.5 FM; "V 97.5 FM") is a community low power radio station broadcasting a variety format. Licensed to Mohawk, New York, the station primarily serves Southern Herkimer County in New York state, commonly referred to as "the Valley" by people in the nearby Utica-Rome area. The station is owned by the Mohawk Valley Radio Group, Inc., and operates from studios on West Main Street in Mohawk.

Programming
WHMV-LP began broadcasting on November 9, 2016. The station plays a "variety" of music formats as the "V" in its branding indicates. The "V" may also stand for the Mohawk Valley, the area to which WHMV-LP broadcasts. In addition to its music programming, WHMV-LP is also planning additional community type programming, among them a program called Mohawk Valley Matters - featuring local guests and covering topics of local concern to Southern Herkimer County.

References

External links
 WHMV-LP's webpage
 The Mohawk Valley Radio Group's website

HMV-LP
HMV-LP
Radio stations established in 2016
2016 establishments in New York (state)
Mainstream adult contemporary radio stations in the United States